The Commander was a Norton motorcycle with a Wankel rotary engine.

The first Norton Wankel motorcycle was the 1987 Classic using an air-cooled engine, built as a special edition of just 100 machines. It was followed by the air-cooled Interpol 2 model.

The Commander was a liquid-cooled successor to the Interpol 2, liquid cooling being adopted for greater power and reliability. The Commander's final-drive chain was protected by a full enclosure. Some cycle parts (such as wheels, forks, switchgear, clocks & brakes) were bought-in Yamaha items from the XJ900.

Two types of Commander were built. The P52 was a single-seat model equipped for police use. The second was the dual-seat P53 civilian tourer. Both the P52 and P53 had panniers integral with their fibreglass bodywork. The P53 bodywork was later revised to have detachable  K2 panniers.

See also
Norton F1
List of motorcycles by type of engine

References

Commander
Motorcycles powered by Wankel engines
Motorcycles introduced in 1988